The Anaheim Storm were a lacrosse team based in Anaheim, California playing in the National Lacrosse League (NLL). The 2005 season was the 4th in franchise history, second in Anaheim (previously the New Jersey Storm), and last before the franchise folded.

The Storm followed up their 1–15 inaugural season in Anaheim by improving to 5–11, and finishing 4th in the West division. The 5–11 record was tied for the best in team history, and was the first time the Storm (whether based in Anaheim or New Jersey) had not finished last in their division. The Storm suspended operations following the 2005 season.

Regular season

Conference standings

Game log
Reference:

Player stats
Reference:

Runners (Top 10)

Note: GP = Games played; G = Goals; A = Assists; Pts = Points; LB = Loose Balls; PIM = Penalty minutes

Goaltenders
Note: GP = Games played; MIN = Minutes; W = Wins; L = Losses; GA = Goals against; Sv% = Save percentage; GAA = Goals against average

Awards

Transactions

Trades

Roster
Reference:

See also
2005 NLL season

References

Anaheim
Anaheim Storm